Johannes van Spengen (20 February 1887 – 9 June 1936) was a Dutch cyclist. He competed in five events at the 1908 Summer Olympics.

See also
 List of Dutch Olympic cyclists

References

External links
 

1887 births
1936 deaths
Dutch male cyclists
Olympic cyclists of the Netherlands
Cyclists at the 1908 Summer Olympics
Cyclists from The Hague